Sébastien Grosjean was the defending champion, but lost in the first round to Robby Ginepri.

Seventh-seeded Robin Söderling won in the final 6–3, 6–7(5–7), 6–1, against Julien Benneteau.

Seeds

Draw

Finals

Top half

Bottom half

External links
Main Draw
Qualifying draw

Singles